This is a  discography for the R&B artist Marques Houston.

Albums

Studio albums

Extended plays

Mixtapes

Singles

Other charted songs

Featured singles

References

Discographies of American artists
Rhythm and blues discographies
Hip hop discographies